Spanish conquest of Oran may refer to:

 Spanish conquest of Oran (1509)
 Spanish conquest of Oran (1732)